Lewis Township may refer to:

 Lewis Township, Scott County, Arkansas, in Scott County, Arkansas
 Lewis Township, Clay County, Indiana
 Lewis Township, Pottawattamie County, Iowa
 Lewis Township, Gove County, Kansas
 Lewis Township, Holt County, Missouri
 Lewis Township, New Madrid County, Missouri
 Lewis Township, Minnesota
 Lewis Township, Clay County, Nebraska
 Lewis Township, Bottineau County, North Dakota
 Lewis Township, Brown County, Ohio
 Lewis Township, Lycoming County, Pennsylvania
 Lewis Township, Northumberland County, Pennsylvania
 Lewis Township, Union County, Pennsylvania

Township name disambiguation pages